Rucandio is a municipality and town located in the province of Burgos, Castile and León, Spain. According to the 2004 census (INE), the municipality had a population of 85 inhabitants.

History 
This territory was established as a municipality when the Ancien Régime overthrew. In that era there were 36 inhabitants.

Demography 
These tables below show the population evolution from the year 1860 to the year 2011.

Main sights 
These are notable sights in the municipality:

 Santo Ángel Shrine
 Natural Site of Caderechas Valley
De los Infanzones Turret

Festivities 
These are the main festivities that are held in the municipality:

 Saint Mary Magdalene Festivity: This festivity is held on 22 July.
 Saint Lawrence Festivity: It is held on 10 August.
 Nuestra Señora de la Piedad Festivity: This festivity is held on 9 September.
 Saint Marina of Aguas Santas Festivity: It is held on 12 September.
 Nuestra Señora de Las Mercedes Festivity: This festivity is consecrated to the Virgin of Mercy. It is held on 24 September.
 San Cosme y San Damián: It is held on 27 September.

References

Municipalities in the Province of Burgos